Seduction is a 1981 Mexican erotic drama film directed by Arturo Ripstein. It was entered into the 12th Moscow International Film Festival.

Cast
 Katy Jurado as Isabel
 Viridiana Alatriste as Mariana
 Gonzalo Vega as Felipe
 Noé Murayama as Romulo

References

External links
 

1981 films
1981 drama films
1980s erotic drama films
Mexican erotic drama films
1980s Spanish-language films
Films directed by Arturo Ripstein
1980s Mexican films